was a Japanese politician and bureaucrat who served as governor of Tokyo from 1979 to 1995.

Biography 
Suzuki graduated from Tokyo Imperial University and worked in the Japanese Home Ministry from 1933 to 1947, and then in the Ministry of Home Affairs, where he worked on the development of the Local Autonomy Law, public election laws and other postwar governance rules. He served as Deputy Chief Cabinet Secretary under Prime Minister Nobusuke Kishi. Governor Ryotaro Azuma appointed Suzuki Vice Governor of Tokyo in 1959, and he served in this capacity until 1967, during which time he was instrumental in the planning of the 1964 Summer Olympics. Azuma declined to run for a third term in 1967, following which Suzuki served in several other roles, including as chairman of the Osaka Expo '70 planning committee.

Suzuki was elected as governor in 1979 with the support of the Liberal Democratic Party. As governor, his most noted accomplishment was the development of the Odaiba area on Tokyo Bay. He also planned the relocation of the Tokyo metropolitan government to its current location in Shinjuku, and the development of the Tokyo International Forum and the Edo-Tokyo Museum. He had planned a major exposition (世界都市博覧会) to be held in Odaiba in 1996, but the plan was cancelled by his successor Yukio Aoshima.

Suzuki died on 14 May 2010. Tokyo Governor Shintaro Ishihara presided over his funeral services at Aoyama Cemetery.

References

|-

|-

|-

1910 births
2010 deaths
Governors of Tokyo
People from Yamagata Prefecture
University of Tokyo alumni